Kari Saarela (born 17 January 1952) is a Finnish biathlete. He competed in the relay event at the 1980 Winter Olympics.

References

External links
 

1952 births
Living people
Finnish male biathletes
Olympic biathletes of Finland
Biathletes at the 1980 Winter Olympics
People from Kurikka
Sportspeople from South Ostrobothnia